The Mahindra Jeeto is a light commercial vehicle by Indian vehicle manufacturer Mahindra, produced in Zaheerabad, Telangana since June 2015.

Overview
The Mahindra Jeeto, intended to replace the Mahindra Gio LCV which went on sale in October 2009, was launched in June 2015 as a 2-door mini pickup truck with a starting price of ₹2.35 lakh with eight variants under three different model series, S, L, and X series, all with varying payloads and deck lengths. The 5-seat microvan variant was launched two years later in July 2017 at a price of Rs. 3.45 lakh.

Plus variant

Engine
The Jeeto lineup uses Mahindra's 625 cc m_Dura water-cooled direct injection (DI) diesel engine, which is exclusively available in the Jeeto. It has a maximum power output of 16 horsepower and 38 Nm of peak torque.

References

Mahindra vehicles
Trucks of India
Cars introduced in 2015